St. Paul's Presbyterian Church is a Presbyterian congregation located in the community of Merigomish, Nova Scotia, Canada.

Early history
St. Paul's Presbyterian Church in Merigomish was founded in 1789 by United Empire Loyalists of Highland Scots descent, with many residents arriving on The Hector in 1773, in Pictou, Nova Scotia.

Growth and expansion

Merigomish Cemetery

Ministers of St. Paul's
 2010–Present Rev. Bonnie Wynn

Notes

External links

Presbyterian churches in Canada
Churches in Nova Scotia
Religious organizations established in 1789
18th-century Presbyterian church buildings in Canada
Buildings and structures in Pictou County, Nova Scotia
1789 establishments in Nova Scotia